The 3x3 basketball tournament at the 2018 Mediterranean Games in Tarragona took place between 27 and 29 June. The men's tournament was held at the Camp de Mart Auditorium. A women's tournament was also organized, after it was cancelled in 2013 because too few teams applied.

Medal summary

Men 
 Participating Nations

Preliminary Round 

All times are Central European Summer Time (UTC+2).

Group A

Group B

Group C

Group D

Elimination stage

Bracket

Quarterfinals

Semifinals

Bronze medal match

Gold medal match

Women 
 Participating Nations

Preliminary Round 

All times are Central European Summer Time (UTC+2).

Group A

Group B

Elimination stage

Bracket

Semifinals

Bronze medal match

Gold medal match

References

Basketball
Basketball at the Mediterranean Games
2018 in 3x3 basketball
Mediterranean Games